Djibrine Abdoul is a Chadian diplomat and the Ambassador of Chad to Russia, with concurrent accreditation to Ukraine, Bulgaria, Poland, the Czech Republic, and Hungary.

References 

Chadian diplomats
Ambassadors of Chad to Russia
Living people
Year of birth missing (living people)
Ambassadors of Chad to Ukraine
Ambassadors of Chad to Bulgaria
Ambassadors of Chad to Poland
Ambassadors of Chad to the Czech Republic
Ambassadors of Chad to Hungary